José Neira Jarabo (1906–1941) was a Spanish anarchist who served in the Spanish Civil War.

Biography 
An electrician by profession, he was affiliated with the CNT-FAI. After the outbreak of the Spanish Civil War he joined the confederal militias, where he held various positions. In January 1937 he was appointed commander of the 59th Mixed Brigade, a unit with which he intervened in the Battle of Alfambra; his unit suffered such casualties that it was disbanded. In August 1938 he received the command of the 36th Division, on the Extremadura front. At the end of the war, he was captured by the nationalists, who subsequently imprisoned him. He was shot in the Eastern Cemetery on 26 September 1941.

References

Bibliography 
 
 
 

1906 births
1941 deaths
Confederación Nacional del Trabajo members
Spanish military personnel of the Spanish Civil War (Republican faction)
People executed by Francoist Spain
Spanish anarchists
Electricians

Executed anarchists